Diego Humberto González Saavedra (born 28 August 1998), nicknamed Oso (Bear), is a Chilean footballer who currently plays as a midfielder for Chilean Primera División side Cobresal on loan from O'Higgins.

Career
González made his professional debut playing for Coquimbo Unido in a Primera B match against Iberia on October 18, 2017 by substitution of Kilian Delgado at the minute 91.

After winning the 2018 Campeonato Loto along with Coquimbo Unido, he was transferred to Primera División side O'Higgins. On April 15, 2021, he was loaned to Cobresal for all 2021 season.

Honours
Coquimbo Unido
 Primera B (1): 2018

References

External links

Diego González at playmakerstats.com (English version of ceroacero.es)

Living people
1998 births
People from Quillota
People from Quillota Province
People from Valparaíso Region
Chilean footballers
Primera B de Chile players
Chilean Primera División players
Coquimbo Unido footballers
O'Higgins F.C. footballers
Cobresal footballers
Association football midfielders